Jesse John Brown (November 3, 1903 – March 16, 1983) was an American football player who played professionally for the Pottsville Maroons of the early National Football League (NFL). After attending and playing for the University of Pittsburgh, he played in 13 games for the Maroons during the 1926 season.

Brown was born in Bangor, Iowa. He died on March 16, 1983, at Ellen Memorial Health Care Center in Honesdale, Pennsylvania.

References

External links
 

1900s births
1987 deaths
American football fullbacks
American football halfbacks
Pittsburgh Panthers football players
Pottsville Maroons players
People from Marshall County, Iowa